The Last Castle is a 2001 American action drama film directed by Rod Lurie, starring Robert Redford, James Gandolfini, Mark Ruffalo and Delroy Lindo. The film portrays a struggle between inmates and the warden of a military prison, based on the United States Disciplinary Barracks at Fort Leavenworth. A highly decorated U.S. Army Lieutenant General, court martialed and sentenced for insubordination, challenges the prison commandant, a colonel, over his treatment of the prisoners. After mobilizing the inmates, the former general leads an uprising aiming to seize control of the prison.

The film was released in the United States on October 19, 2001. It received mixed reviews from critics and was a box-office bomb, grossing just $27 million against its $72 million budget.

Plot

Lieutenant General Eugene Irwin is to complete a 10-year sentence in a maximum security military prison for sending his troops on a mission in Burundi, violating a presidential order and resulting in eight soldiers' deaths.

Prison commandant Colonel Winter greatly admires Irwin, until he calls his much-prized military artifacts collection something no true battlefield veteran would ever have. An offended Winter, who has never seen combat, resents the remark. He then opposes what he perceives as Irwin's attempt to change the attitudes of the prisoners, causing his admiration for Irwin to dissipate.

On one occasion, Irwin is reprimanded for stopping a guard from clubbing prisoner Corporal Ramon Aguilar, who had saluted Irwin in the prison yard. A tenet of Winter's methods for running the prison, that the prisoners are no longer soldiers and therefore should stop acting as such.

Continuing to observe cruelty, Irwin attempts to unify the prisoners by building a "castle wall" of stone and mortar at the facility, which resembles a medieval castle in many ways. Envying the respect Irwin is clearly receiving, Winter orders his guards to destroy the wall. When Aguilar, an integral leader in the wall's construction, blocks the bulldozer, Winter orders sadistic sharpshooter Cpl. Zamorro to fire a normally non-lethal rubber bullet directly at his head, killing him.

After the wall is destroyed, Irwin and the inmates pay final respects to Aguilar in formation. Winter later offers some small concessions which are rejected as flimsy. Irwin calls him a disgrace to the uniform, demanding his resignation.

The prisoners begin to behave like soldiers around Irwin, using code words and gestures. An infuriated Winter reaches out to Yates, an anti-social prisoner, former officer and Apache helicopter pilot convicted of running a drug-smuggling ring. Bribed with a reduced sentence to inform about Irwin's plans, Yates tells Winter that Irwin intends to take over the prison, then raise the U.S. flag upside down to signal distress.

Irwin organizes a plot to throw the prison into chaos. His intent is to show a friend, Brigadier General Wheeler, Winter's superior, that he is unfit and should be removed from command under the Uniform Code of Military Justice. During a visit, Winter receives a letter demanding his resignation, or the prisoners will kidnap Wheeler.

After ordering his men into action, Winter discovers that the scheme was just a bluff. Irwin uses the event to gain intelligence on how the prison guards would react during an actual uprising. Wheeler, who has made it clear that he hates Winter, nevertheless respects his argument that Wheeler has no idea how to run a military prison; he offers to transfer Irwin to another prison upon Winter's request, but he declines.

Yates discreetly steals a U.S. flag from the warden's office during one of his visits, revealing he is on Irwin's side; Winter orders all the prisoners to the yard in an attempt to prevent their plot, but this was part of their plan as well, and the riot commences.

Using improvised weapons, the prisoners capture an armored vehicle and the prison helicopter, which Yates uses to kill Zamorro. The prisoners call Wheeler's headquarters and inform him of the riot. Winter has little time to regain control before Wheeler arrives to see the prison under siege, so he orders use of live ammunition against the prisoners.

Winter knows from Yates that Irwin ultimately plans to raise the American flag upside down, signaling distress. Irwin's men create havoc, but ultimately are confronted by overwhelming numbers of guards armed with live ammunition. Winter orders the men to lie down, but they refuse. He orders them again, warning them that the sharpshooters positioned above them will fire if they do not obey. Just before he gives the order, Irwin orders his fellow prisoners to lie down. Winter then tells Irwin to return his flag, but Irwin replies, "It's not your flag", before he turns and begins walking toward the flagpole to raise it.

An increasingly unsettled Winter tells Irwin, "You will not raise that flag upside down," but Irwin continues walking, despite the orders to cease and desist. Seeing that Irwin is ignoring him, Winter orders the shooters to fire on him, but they refuse. He orders them repeatedly but, as absolutely all of his men refuse to kill Irwin, Winter fatally shoots him in the back.. As his life ebbs away, Irwin continues to raise the flag.

Peretz places Winter under arrest for shooting Irwin. The prisoners, now standing again, begin to salute the flag. Astonishingly, Winter notices that Irwin has actually raised the flag right-side-up, meaning that he had shot Irwin fruitlessly. The flag flies above the prison's walls as General Wheeler arrives. Colonel Winter is led away in handcuffs. The inmates build a new wall as a memorial to their fallen comrades. Aguilar and Irwin's names are among those carved onto the castle wall.

Cast

 Robert Redford as Lieutenant General Eugene Irwin
 James Gandolfini as Colonel Ed Winter
 Mark Ruffalo as Sam Yates
 Delroy Lindo as Brigadier General Jim Wheeler
 Steve Burton as Captain Peretz
 Paul Calderón as Sergeant Major Dellwo
 Samuel Ball as Duffy
 Jeremy Childs as Cutbush
 Clifton Collins, Jr. as Corporal Aguilar
 Brian Goodman as Beaupre
 Michael Irby as Enriquez
 Robin Wright as Rosalie Irwin, the general's daughter (uncredited)
 David Alford as Corporal Zamorro

Production

The film was shot mainly at the 103-year-old former Tennessee State Prison in Nashville, which had previously been used for filming in The Green Mile and Last Dance, and was chosen because of its Gothic and castle-like appearance. The state of Tennessee offered to provide the location rent-free, with exemption from the state's 6 percent state sales tax. James Gandolfini earned $5 million for co-starring in the film after finishing the third season of The Sopranos in March 2001.

A crew of 150 worked on refurbishing existing buildings and constructing new buildings in a time limit of nine weeks. A metal walkway and two towers were also built as vantage points for the guards. The film required an office with a large window through which the warden could watch the inmates; this was constructed by the production crew. Director Rod Lurie insisted on having the prisoners' cells face each other, but this is not the case at the Tennessee State Prison. To solve the problem, production designer Kirk Petruccelli created cells in a warehouse near the prison.

Cinematography
To show the balance of power, the film crew used multiple cinematography techniques involving different displays of color, lighting, camera and costumes. In the warden's office intense color was used to reflect freedom or power, in contrast to the washed-out colors from the less powerful yard. The contrasts shift as the story progresses, showing the increasing power of the prisoners. The American flag in the yard is described by Petruccelli as "the heart of The Castle" and is the only exemption to the washed-out color palette.

Cinematographer Shelly Johnson, in collaboration with director Lurie and the design team, also used lighting and camerawork to signify the shifting of powers. For example, the yard is at first naturally lit and more influenced by daylight, in contrast to Winter's office, which is artificially illuminated by lamps. As the film progresses, the office is more fully infiltrated by exterior light through a broken window. The shift of power is also emphasized through camera techniques. Hand-held cameras were used when filming in the yard to make the audience feel as if they were "participants in the action". However, a very precise, sterile camera composition was used in the warden's office. The prisoners' world gets more precise during the film, while the colonel's world is filmed more loosely.

Costume designer Ha Nguyen also demonstrates this contrast in the clothing of the cast. The film starts with the prisoners having their clothing divided by ethnicity, with African Americans wearing different headwear, Latinos wearing vests and various arm accessories, and the White Americans in cut-off T-shirts. After the arrival of General Irwin, the prisoners start wearing more similar clothing in a "sharp military manner". The uniforms of the prisoners change from the usual chocolate brown color to light grey, because of its muddled look on film and excessive darkness in some scenes. Ha Nguyen also contrasted the non-battlefield ribbons found on Colonel Winter's uniform with the battlefield medals found on General Irwin's uniform (seen only in the opening scene as Irwin is inducted into the prison).

The wall created by the prisoners in the middle of the yard also represents change and incarnation. What is at first a "discombobulated mess" representing the lack of unity among prisoners later becomes a perfect wall, a "powerful symbol of the results of [Irwin's] leadership".

Effects
Special effects supervisor Burt Dalton and stunt coordinator Mic Rodger created the battle weapons used in the final scenes. The water cannon had the power to shoot  of water per second. Some of the cast did their own stunts, including Mark Ruffalo, who performed one scene hanging from a helicopter. Interiors of the helicopter were not created with blue screen effects; instead, a special gimbal was used to hold a full-sized Huey-A type military helicopter. The gimbal was capable of rotating the helicopter 360 degrees and vertically moving it 20 feet. The gimbal was controlled by a computer, allowing Dalton to precisely set speed and movement; this ensured precise repeatability for multiple takes.

Release

Prior to release, DreamWorks pulled the original  poster from circulation, which depicted an American flag flying upside down (a standard distress call), due to concerns about public sensitivity related to the September 11 attacks.

The film was released on October 19, 2001, in 2,262 North American theaters, grossing $7,088,213 on its opening weekend with an average of $3,133 per theater. The release spanned 63 days (9 weeks), closing on December 20, 2001, with a total domestic gross of $18,244,060. The film grossed $9,398,647 overseas, with the lowest earning in Egypt ($5,954) and the highest ($1,410,528) in Germany.

Reception
On Rotten Tomatoes the film has an approval rating of 52% based on 114 reviews, with an average rating of 5.5/10. The website's critical consensus reads, "The Last Castle is well acted and rousing for the most part, but the story cannot stand up to close scrutiny." At Metacritic, a rating website which assigns a normalized rating, the film has a score of 42 out of 100, based on 32 critics, indicating "mixed or average reviews". Audiences polled by CinemaScore gave the film an average grade of "A−" on an A+ to F scale.

Mick LaSalle from the San Francisco Chronicle mentioned the cast, describing Redford as "no George C. Scott" and Gandolfini as an unusual choice to play an icy intellectual. LaSalle stated that "'The Last Castle', on the surface, seems like a naive film about a great leader's capacity to inspire", but at closer look "seems to mean one thing but means another upon reflection". Roger Ebert from the Chicago Sun-Times saw it as "a dramatic, involving story" but criticized its "loopholes and lapses." Ebert noted that Irwin is no less evil than Winter and that they both "delight in manipulating those they can control."  He pointed out that the film fails to portray how the prisoners manufacture the weapons and hide them under Winter's observation.

It received 3 out of 5 stars on IGN; the review noted that though a well paced and well acted film, it "suffers from this overall militaristic, streamlined approach."

Kenneth Turan of the Los Angeles Times said the film's "pretensions lead to a slow, even stately pace, what should be crackling confrontations between Irwin and Winter end up playing more like a tea party than a Wagnerian battle of wills."

Owen Gleiberman of Entertainment Weekly gave the movie a "C-plus" grade, writing: "As staged by Lurie, the drama has all the subtlety and surprise of a showdown between the sissy-bully son of Captain Queeg and a hero who's like a fusion of Brubaker, Spartacus, and Norma Rae."

Variety wrote: "Much of the potential dramatic juice has been drained out of The Last Castle, a disappointingly pedestrian prison meller that falls between stools artistically and politically."

Claudia Puig of USA Today criticized the writing, citing "a losing battle with an implausible script."

Elvis Mitchell of The New York Times wrote: "The movie is exuberant, strapping and obvious—a problem drama suffering from a steroid overdose."

Accolades
The Last Castle won the Taurus World Stunt Award for best fire stunt and was nominated for best aerial work and best stunt coordination sequence. Clifton Collins, Jr. was nominated for an ALMA Award in the "Outstanding Supporting Actor in a Motion Picture" category.

References

External links

 
 

2000s prison drama films
2001 action drama films
2001 films
American action drama films
American prison drama films
DreamWorks Pictures films
Films about the United States Army
Films directed by Rod Lurie
Films scored by Jerry Goldsmith
Films shot in Tennessee
2000s English-language films
2000s American films